Ali Darzi (born 1959) is an Iranian linguist and professor of linguistics at the University of Tehran. He is known for his contributions to Persian syntax. Darzi received his MA from University of Tehran and earned his PhD from University of Illinois at Urbana–Champaign.

Books
 Syntactic argumentation, Tehran: SAMT, 2006
 Darzi, Ali , and Vahid Sadeghi, The Syntactic and Phonetic Correlates of Topicalization and Raising Construction in Persian, Tehran: University of Tehran Press, 2012

References

External links
 Ali Darzi at the University of Tehran

1959 births
Living people
Linguists from Iran
University of Tehran alumni
University of Illinois Urbana-Champaign alumni
Academic staff of the University of Tehran
Syntacticians
Grammarians of Persian
Iranian grammarians
Linguists of Persian